The Baeksang Arts Award for Best Screenplay – Television is annually presented at the Baeksang Arts Awards ceremony.

List of winners

Sources

External links

References 

Baeksang Arts Awards (television)
Screenwriting awards for television